Nimia Murua (born 4 December 1997) is a Panamanian swimmer. She competed in the women's 50 metre backstroke event at the 2018 FINA World Swimming Championships (25 m), in Hangzhou, China.

References

External links
 

1997 births
Living people
Panamanian female swimmers
Female backstroke swimmers
Competitors at the 2018 South American Games
Competitors at the 2018 Central American and Caribbean Games
Central American and Caribbean Games competitors for Panama
Swimmers at the 2019 Pan American Games
Pan American Games competitors for Panama
Place of birth missing (living people)
20th-century Panamanian women
21st-century Panamanian women